Sergei Shmolik (born January 12, 1965) is a former Belarusian football referee who operated in the Belarusian Premier League and had been FIFA-listed since 1993.

In July 2008, he was banned from refereeing after being found to have refereed a league game between Naftan and Vitebsk drunk.

References

External links
 Profile at Football-LineUps.com

1965 births
Living people
Belarusian football referees